Fred Collindridge (1899–1969) was a British trade union leader.

Born in Wombwell, Collindridge became a coal miner and joined the Yorkshire Miners' Association.  His older brother, Frank Collindridge, also became a prominent trade unionist, and then a Member of Parliament.

In 1946, Collindridge was elected as vice-president of the Yorkshire Miners, and then in 1954 as its general secretary.  The association was part of the National Union of Mineworkers, and Collindridge served on its national executive committee from 1953 until 1961, then became its vice-president.  He retired in 1964, and died five years later.

References

1899 births
1969 deaths
People from Wombwell
Trade unionists from Yorkshire
Vice Presidents of the National Union of Mineworkers (Great Britain)